The Yavuz Sultan Selim Bridge is a bridge for rail and motor vehicle transit over the Bosphorus strait, to the north of two existing suspension bridges in Istanbul, Turkey. It was initially named the Third Bosphorus Bridge (with 15 July Martyrs Bridge being the First Bosphorus Bridge and Fatih Sultan Mehmet Bridge the Second Bosphorus Bridge). The bridge is located near the Black Sea entrance of the Bosphorus strait, between Garipçe in Sarıyer on the European side and Poyrazköy in Beykoz on the Asian side.

The foundation stone laying ceremony was held on 29 May 2013. The bridge was opened to traffic on 26 August 2016.

At , the bridge is one of the tallest bridges in the world. It is the fifth-tallest bridge in the world of any type.

Project 

The bridge is part of the projected  Northern Marmara Motorway, which will bypass urban areas of Istanbul in the north connecting Kınalı, Silivri in the west and Paşaköy, Hendek in the east. The main span is the 13th longest suspension bridge in the world.

Designed by the Swiss engineer Jean-François Klein (project leader) and by the French structural engineer Michel Virlogeux from T-ingénierie (a Geneva-based company), the bridge is a combined road-rail bridge. It carries four motorway lanes and one railway track in each direction. The construction was carried out by a consortium of the Turkish company İçtaş and the Italian company Astaldi which won the bid to construct the structure on 30 May 2012. The budgeted cost of the bridge's construction was 4.5 billion TRY (approximately US$2.5 billion as of March 2013). The construction was originally expected to be completed in 36 months with the opening date scheduled for the end of 2015. On 29 May 2013 then Prime Minister Recep Tayyip Erdoğan directed the construction management team to finish the construction within 24 months, and projected an opening date for 29 May 2015.

The bridge toll is set to be 9.90 between the motorway exits Odayeri and Paşaköy. It is expected that at least 135,000 vehicles will use the bridge daily in each direction. Minister of Transport and Communication Binali Yıldırım stated that of the total area to be nationalised for the bridge project, 9.57% was private property, 75.24% was forested land, and the remaining 15.19% was already state-owned land.

In June 2018, in the course of the Turkish currency and debt crisis, Bloomberg reported that Astaldi, an Italian multinational construction company, was poised to sell its stake in the flagship Yavuz Sultan Selim Bridge project for $467 million. The project had failed to meet projections, requiring Ankara to boost operators' revenue from treasury coffers, and since early 2018 the partners in the joint venture sought restructuring of $2.3 billion of debt from creditors. On July 30, 2018, China's ICBC was authorized as the lead regulator to refinance the $2.7 billion current loan for the bridge.

Construction history 

Plans for a third Bosphorus bridge were approved by the Ministry of Transportation in 2012. The construction of the project was awarded to the İçtaş-Astaldi consortium on 29 May 2012.

The construction of the bridge began officially with the foundation stone-laying in a ceremony held on 29 May 2013, the anniversary day of the conquest of Constantinople in 1453. The ceremony was attended by the then State President Abdullah Gül, Prime Minister Recep Tayyip Erdoğan and numerous high-ranking officials. Erdoğan directed the construction management team to complete construction within 24 months, and set the opening date for 29 May 2015.

Work was temporarily halted in July 2013, after it became evident that the site was mislocated, but only after the removal of thousands of trees. The action, announced in paperwork filed for a plan change written by State Highways Directorate Director-General Mehmet Cahit Turhan on 11 June 2013, reads "it is appropriate to cancel the current construction plan due to the necessity of making a revision, which resulted from changes of the route project". Both the ministry and the construction company have denied any change to the construction site location.

Land prices in the northern, less urbanized areas on both sides of the Bosphorus are already soaring in expectation of an urbanization boom thanks to the new cross-water connection, according to Ekumenopolis, a documentary film of 2010 about the area. The efficacy of the proclaimed goal of easing traffic congestion has been challenged, claiming that "the project is little more than a contrivance to open for development lands that had been long protected by law". The green areas and wetlands in question, producing most of the drinking water for the city, are considered by many to be "essential for Istanbul's ecological and economic sustainability, and a possible pollution of the groundwater would provoke the collapse of the city". In 1995, Erdoğan, then mayor of Istanbul, declared that a third bridge would mean "the murder of the city".

On 5 April 2014, at about 21:00 local time, a fatal accident occurred during construction work at the link road to the bridge on the Asian side of the Bosphorus near Çavuşbaşı, Beykoz. Three workers were killed and another was injured by falling from a collapsed  scaffolding while concrete was poured at a viaduct.

Naming 

The name of the bridge was announced by President Abdullah Gül at the ground-breaking ceremony as the Yavuz Sultan Selim Bridge, in honor of Ottoman Sultan Selim I (c. 1470–1520), who expanded the Ottoman Empire into the Middle East and North Africa in 1514–1517 and obtained the title of Caliph of Islam for the Ottoman dynasty after his conquest of Egypt in 1517. He was nicknamed Yavuz, traditionally translated in English as "Grim", but closer to "Stern" or "Implacable" in meaning. In 1520 he was succeeded by his son Suleiman the Magnificent.

The choice of name for the bridge has led to protests by Alevis in Turkey because of the alleged role of Sultan Selim I in the Ottoman persecution of Alevis. After the Şahkulu Rebellion (1511) in Anatolia, and the Battle of Chaldiran (1514) in northwestern Iran, during which the Qizilbash warriors of the Alevis in eastern Anatolia (who adhere to the Shia sect of Islam) sided with Shah Ismail I of Safavid Persia, the victorious Selim I ordered the massacre of the Qizilbash, whom he considered traitors and heretics (see also Ottoman–Safavid relations and Ottoman–Persian Wars).

Opening ceremony 
The opening ceremony on 26 August 2016 was attended by Bulgarian Prime Minister Boyko Borisov, Bosniak president of Bosnia and Herzegovina Bakir Izetbegović, Macedonian President Gjorge Ivanov, the King of Bahrain Hamad bin Isa Al Khalifa and President of the self-declared state of Northern Cyprus Mustafa Akıncı. Also, Chief Minister of Punjab (Pakistan) Shahbaz Sharif, Sandžak Bosniak Deputy Prime Minister of Serbia Rasim Ljajić, First Vice Prime Minister of Georgia Dimitri Kumsishvili and high-ranking officials from Azerbaijan also attended the opening ceremony. Speeches were delivered by Turkish President Recep Tayyip Erdoğan and Prime Minister Binali Yıldırım.

Galleries

Stages of construction

See also 
 Istanbul Canal
Istanbul Airport
Bosphorus Bridge
 Fatih Sultan Mehmet Bridge
 Osman Gazi Bridge
 Çanakkale 1915 Bridge
 Eurasia Tunnel, undersea tunnel, crossing the Bosphorus for vehicular traffic, opened in December 2016.
 Marmaray, undersea rail tunnel connecting the Asian and European sides of Istanbul.
 Great Istanbul Tunnel, a proposed three-level road-rail undersea tunnel.
 Public transport in Istanbul
 Rail transport in Turkey
 Turkish Straits

References

Sources

External links 
 

2016 establishments in Turkey
Beykoz
Bosphorus crossings
Bridges completed in 2016
Bridges in Istanbul
Cable-stayed bridges in Turkey
Railway bridges in Turkey
Road bridges in Turkey
Road-rail bridges
Sarıyer
Toll bridges in Turkey